Harris Street is the main thoroughfare in the Inner West suburbs of Pyrmont and Ultimo in Sydney, New South Wales, Australia. It runs from the northern tip of the Pyrmont peninsula to Broadway in the central business district. Harris Street was formerly lined by industrial sites such as the Ultimo Power Station, Ultimo Tram Depot and the Government Printing Office.

However, redevelopment of Pyrmont from a largely industrial suburb to a more residential and commercial precinct has seen the University of Technology, Sydney and the Australian Broadcasting Corporation call Harris Street home. Until the late 1950s electric trams ran down the length of Harris Street, when they were replaced by bus services.

As part of the Western Distributor, in May 1980 Harris Street was converted to one way in a northerly direction from Fig Street to Union Street; it returned to a two-way street in 1995 after the Western Distributor was extended via the Anzac Bridge. On 13 December 1987, Harris Street was converted to one way southbound from Mary Ann Street to Broadway.

References

Streets in Sydney
Pyrmont, New South Wales
Ultimo, New South Wales